Every Six Seconds is the second studio album by American rock band Saliva. It is their first album under Island Records. In July 2008, Every Six Seconds was certified platinum by the RIAA.

Title meaning
Josey Scott revealed the meaning of the album's title in an interview with Therese McKeon from the website Shoutweb:

Reception
Alternative Press (5/01, p. 88) – 3 out of 5 – "A pop-metal band with a penchant for pretty, angst-ridden melodies for lonely boys and girls."
CMJ (3/12/01, p. 19) – "Of-the-moment aggro, with an emphasis on rapcore moments interrupted by melodic, clean vocals."

Track listing

Personnel
Credits adapted from album’s liner notes.

Saliva
 Josey Scott – vocals
 Wayne Swinny – lead guitar, mandolin, banjo, lapsteel
 Chris D'Abaldo – rhythm guitar
 Dave Novotny – bass
 Paul Crosby – drums, percussion

Production
 Bob Marlette — producer, engineer, mixing (tracks 1, 3, 7, 8, 12)
 John Goodmanson — mixing (tracks 2, 4-6, 9, 11)
 Steve Thompson — mixing (tracks 2, 4-6, 9, 11)
 Ron St. Germain — mixing (track 10)
 George Marino — mastering

Charts

Weekly charts

Year-end charts

Singles

Certifications

References

2001 albums
Rap metal albums
Saliva (band) albums
Island Records albums
Albums produced by Bob Marlette